The 2022–23 Premier League of Bosnia and Herzegovina, known as Liga 12 and also known as M:tel Premier League for sponsorship reasons, is the 23rd season of the Premier League of Bosnia and Herzegovina, the highest football league of Bosnia and Herzegovina. The season began on 15 July 2022 and will end on 28 May 2023, with a winter break between late November 2022 and late February 2023, due to the 2022 FIFA World Cup which was held between 20 November and 18 December 2022.

Zrinjski Mostar are the defending champions, having won their seventh Premier League title in the previous season.

Teams
A total of 12 teams are currently contesting in the league, including 10 sides from the 2021–22 season and two promoted from each of the second-level leagues, Igman Konjic and Sloga Meridian, replacing relegated sides Radnik Bijeljina and Rudar Prijedor.

Stadiums and locations

Personnel and kits

Note: Flags indicate national team as has been defined under FIFA eligibility rules. Players and Managers may hold more than one non-FIFA nationality.

League table

Positions by table
The table lists the positions of teams after each week of matches. In order to preserve chronological evolvements, any postponed matches are not included to the round at which they were originally scheduled, but added to the full round they were played immediately afterwards.

Results

Rounds 1–22

Rounds 23–33

Top goalscorers

References

External links

2022–23
Bosnia and Herzegovina
1